Orris Pratt was a member of the Wisconsin State Assembly, serving one term. Born in Michigan, he moved to Wisconsin as a child with his family. He followed his father into farming and politics.

Biography
Orris Pratt was born on September 18, 1837, in White Pigeon, Michigan. His parents were Samuel Pratt and his wife. The family moved to Wisconsin, where they settled in what became Spring Prairie, and his parents developed a farm. Samuel Pratt was elected as a member of the Assembly and of the Wisconsin State Senate.

The younger Pratt followed his father into farming. He married and had a family, and farmed in Spring Prairie.

Political career
Pratt was elected as a member of the Assembly from Spring Prairie in 1883. Previously, he had chaired the town board (similar to city council) of Spring Prairie in 1881 and 1882. He was a Republican.

References

People from White Pigeon, Michigan
People from Spring Prairie, Wisconsin
Republican Party members of the Wisconsin State Assembly
Wisconsin city council members
Farmers from Wisconsin
1837 births
Year of death missing